Miguel Ángel Pérez Pilipiux (born 10 April 1947) is a Spanish former professional footballer who played as a forward.

Club career
Pérez was born in Buenos Aires, Argentina, and began his professional career in 1965 with Deportivo Italiano, in the second division. The following year he moved abroad, signing with La Liga powerhouse Real Madrid who also briefly loaned him to AS Monaco FC in France.

Pérez was used mainly as a backup during his six-year spell at the Santiago Bernabéu Stadium, but contributed to the conquest of two leagues and one Copa del Rey. His best individual season at the club was 1970–71 as he scored four goals in 20 games (19 starts), but Real came out empty in silverware, finishing the league in fourth position.

Also in the country, Pérez played one year in the top division for Real Zaragoza, then took his game to the Spanish lower leagues – appearing for three teams in as many seasons – before retiring in 1977 at the age of 30.

International career
Pérez played one match for the Spain under-23 side, a 0–1 loss against France on 18 March 1971.

Personal life
Pérez settled in Spain after his retirement, fathering two sons, Miguel and Alejandro, both of whom went on to represent several teams, almost always in the second division.

Honours
Real Madrid
La Liga: 1967–68, 1968–69
Copa del Generalísimo: 1969–70

References

External links

Madridista stats 

1947 births
Living people
Argentine sportspeople of Spanish descent
Footballers from Buenos Aires
Argentine footballers
Spanish footballers
Association football forwards
Spain under-23 international footballers
Primera Nacional players
Sportivo Italiano footballers
La Liga players
Segunda División players
Real Madrid CF players
Real Zaragoza players
Rayo Vallecano players
CD Castellón footballers
AD Alcorcón footballers
Ligue 1 players
AS Monaco FC players
Argentine expatriate footballers
Expatriate footballers in Spain
Expatriate footballers in Monaco
Argentine expatriate sportspeople in Monaco
Argentine expatriate sportspeople in Spain